The Jalisco team, formerly called Atlético Jalisco, was a Mexican professional football team based in Guadalajara, Jalisco, Mexico that played in Liga de Balompié Mexicano.

History 
The team was founded on July 4, 2020, being the fourteenth founding franchise in the Liga de Balompié Mexicano, in addition to the third based in the Guadalajara metropolitan area.  On July 24, Eduardo Lillingston was appointed as the team's technical director, in addition, the same day the first players in history were announced: Jonny Magallón, César Ibáñez, Jahir Barraza and Ricardo Bocanegra.

On September 1, 2020 the team announced the Estadio Tres de Marzo as its home field, being the third team in the league to use the same venue. On October 17, 2020, the team made its official debut, defeating Club Veracruzano de Fútbol Tiburón 1–3. 

At the end of October 2020, it was announced that the players and the coaching staff had not received the established salaries for several months, as a result of this situation, the league board cut off relations with the club's board and temporarily took over the administration. Subsequently, the team lost the right to use the original name and shield, because these had been registered by the previous owners and they denied the rights of use, so on October 31, 2020 the team had to play its match against Chapulineros de Oaxaca as a nameless team. A few days later the team was provisionally named as Jalisco team. The LBM takes over the team with the aim of getting new investors to manage the franchise, so the club will have a new name when the arrival of new owners is completed.

On November 9, 2020, Atlético Jalisco was disaffiliated, because the LBM broke relations with its board of directors due to debts, and the league was unable to find new investors to continue operating the team.

Stadium 
The Estadio 3 de Marzo, is situated in Zapopan district that forms part of the Guadalajara Metropolitan Area, and is the ground of Tecos, which plays in the Liga Premier de México. Since 2020 it is the ground of Atlético Jalisco, Halcones de Zapopan and Jaguares de Jalisco, which both are set to compete in the Liga de Balompié Mexicano. The stadium has a capacity of 18,779 and was constructed on the campus of the Universidad Autónoma de Guadalajara.

Players

First-team squad

References 

Association football clubs established in 2020
Association football clubs disestablished in 2020
2020 establishments in Mexico
Football clubs in Jalisco
Football clubs in Guadalajara, Jalisco
Liga de Balompié Mexicano Teams